is a railway station in the city of Nikkō, Tochigi, Japan, operated by the private railway operator Tobu Railway. The station is numbered "TN-22".

Lines

Station layout
The station consists of two opposed side platforms, connected to the station entrance by a footbridge.

Platforms

Adjacent stations

History
Myōjin Station opened on 1 November 1929. It became unstaffed from 1 September 1973.

From 17 March 2012, station numbering was introduced on all Tobu lines, with Myōjin Station becoming "TN-22".

Passenger statistics
In fiscal 2019, the station was used by an average of 229 passengers daily (boarding passengers only).

Surrounding area
Imaichi Myōjin Post Office

See also
 List of railway stations in Japan

References

External links

 Myōjin Station information 

Railway stations in Tochigi Prefecture
Stations of Tobu Railway
Railway stations in Japan opened in 1929
Tobu Nikko Line
Nikkō, Tochigi